Haffenden is a surname. Notable people with the surname include:

Elizabeth Haffenden (1906–1976), British costume designer
John Haffenden (born 1945), English academic and writer
Ray Haffenden, New Zealand rugby league player, coach, and administrator